Old Jewish Cemetery may refer to:
 Old Jewish Cemetery, Chernihiv
 Old Jewish cemetery, Cieszyn
 Old Jewish Cemetery, Cincinnati
 Old Jewish Cemetery, Frankfurt
 Old Jewish Cemetery, Hanover
 Old Jewish cemetery, Hebron
 Old Jewish Cemetery, Prague
 Old Jewish Cemetery, Sarajevo
 Old Jewish Cemetery, Split
 Old Jewish Cemetery, Wrocław
 Remuh Cemetery, a cemetery in Kraków, Poland
 Israel Benevolent Society Cemetery, a cemetery in Chambersburg, Pennsylvania, United States
 Chatam Sofer Memorial, a cemetery in Bratislava, Slovakia